Kater Mikesch (original title: Kocour Mikeš) is a children's book by the Czech author Josef Lada from the 1930s. It was retold by German author Otfried Preußler, who was awarded therefore with the Deutscher Jugendliteraturpreis in 1963. In 1964, it was adapted into a German children's television series by the Augsburger Puppenkiste marionette theatre company.

Plot
In the little village of Holleschitz there lives the cobbler Pepik and his grandmother. She has a tomcat called Mikesch. Pepik and Mikesch get friends, and Pepik successfully schools Mikesch to speak. Many people in Holleschitz are startled and staggered by the polite and lovely tomcat and embosom him. The cobbler makes him a pair of boots. And the cuttler makes him a garment, because Mikesch helped him. Besides Mikesch, grandmother owns the dog Sultan and the pig Paschik. Mikesch schools the pig to speak. With the local shepherd, there lives the fierce ramgoat Bobesch, whom the shepherd wants to sell on the local market. Pepik saves him by schooling him to speak. Bobesch pledges the shepherd to behave. Paschik, Bobesch and Mikesch get good friends. One day, Mikesch smashes the cream pot of grandmother. Because of a guilty conscience and fear of her reaction, he runs off and goes out into the world to search for work. He succeeds in this with the circus Klutzki. With a lot of money in his pockets, a new cream pot and lots of presents for his friends, he returns home. There he gets to know Maunzerle, who is a part of the cobblers household and also has learned to speak, but not as well at all as Mikesch.

See also

List of German television series

References

External links
 

1936 children's books
Czech children's literature
Picture books
German children's television series
German television shows featuring puppetry
Television shows based on children's books
1964 German television series debuts
1964 German television series endings
German-language television shows
Das Erste original programming
Books about cats